Loney Clinton Gordon (1915–1999) was an African-American chemist and laboratory researcher who assisted doctors Pearl Kendrick and Grace Eldering with bacteriological virulence research leading to the creation of the pertussis vaccine.

Early life and education
Gordon was born in Arkansas in 1915, and moved to Michigan with her family as a young child. In 1939, Gordon earned a bachelor's degree in home economics and chemistry from what was then called Michigan State College. Following college, she sought a career as a dietitian. She found a job working as a dietitian in a mental institution in Virginia, but, according to a 1999 interview with Gordon by Grand Valley State University history professor Carolyn Shapiro Shapin, Gordon said the doctor treated her poorly and she was given inadequate living quarters. She returned to Grand Rapids to seek work, but she was informed that "white male chefs would not want to take orders from a black female dietitian." She was hired by Dr. Kendrick to support pertussis research at the Michigan Department of Health's Grand Rapids lab around 1944.

Research
In the early 1940s, Gordon tested thousands of culture plates, trying to find the culture that would have sufficient virulence to make the vaccine. The work was conducted at Western Michigan Laboratories, later known as Kent Community Hospital, located in Grand Rapids, Michigan. Gordon's work focused on pertussis cultures and virulence of the bacterium Bordetella pertussis. Gordon's analysis of pertussis cultures led to identification of a powerful strain of the organism, which enabled the development of an effective vaccine.

The Michigan Biological Products Division, which was part of the Michigan Health Department, began producing the vaccine for state use in 1938, and then distributed across the United States by 1940. Gordon is attributed with the identification of sheep blood as the key to the process of incubating the culture in petri dishes in the laboratory.

Recognition
In 1997, the Grand Rapids Public Library had a display on women who made a difference, and it featured Gordon.

Michigan House of Representatives Resolution No. 115, sponsored by Representative Lynne Martinez recognized the work of Gordon. The resolution stated, "in sincere appreciation and acknowledgment to Loney Gordon for the contribution that she has made to the health of the citizens of our State, our nation, and the world through her work in the development of a vaccine against whooping cough..."

Gordon was inducted into the Michigan Women's Hall of Fame in 2000.

Later life and death
Gordon worked for the Michigan Department of Health beginning in around 1956 and retiring in 1978.

After World War II, Gordon was selected to travel to Europe and the Middle East with the National Council of Christian and Jews to “take the pulse of the people” in the area.

Gordon died in 1999.

Personal life
Loney Clinton married Howard Gordon on June 23, 1956.

References

20th-century American chemists
American women chemists
1915 births
1999 deaths
20th-century American women scientists
20th-century African-American women
20th-century African-American scientists
Scientists from Arkansas
Scientists from Michigan